Elsa Rosalinda Oseguera Amaya (born 1992)is a Honduran journalist. At the age of 18, she began working at Canal 6. Later she shifted to VTV, where she worked as a news reader. As of 2015, she worked at HCH in San Pedro Sula. She has been referred to as the 'Honduran Kim Kardashian' in national media.

References

1992 births
Honduran television journalists
Living people
Place of birth missing (living people)
Date of birth missing (living people)